Rosalind Williams may refer to:
Rosalind Rajagopal (née Williams, 1903–1996), American theosophist and educator
Rosalind H. Williams, American historian of technology